Georgy Nikolaevich (or Mykolayovych) Vysotsky (7 February 1865 – 6 April 1940) was a Ukrainian and Soviet soil scientist and forester who worked in the steppe where he examined forest growth and the effects of soil factors.

Vysotsky was born in Nikitovka and went to the St. Petersburg Petrovsky Agricultural Academy in 1886 where he came under the influence of Vasily Dokuchaev and Georgy Fedorovich Morozov. He worked from 1890 at the Berdyansk reserve and in 1892 he joined Dokuchaev on an expedition to Poltava and became manager of the Great Anatolian forest reserve. Here he experimented on the use of forest strips to manage droughts. From 1904 he worked on experimental forestry near Samara. From 1913 he worked on reforestation of the steppe near Kiev and from 1918 he began to teach, first in Kiev, and then at Simferopol, Minsk and then Kharkiv. He conducted research on forest growth and regrowth, studying soil hydrology, soil salinity and other factors. A major contribution was his approach to measuring the moisture balance of forests which has been modified subsequently and goes by the name of Vysotsky-Ivanov moisture coefficient defined as the ratio of the annual precipitation to the annual evaporation. Based on this index, he suggested a land classification. In 1915 he received the Semenov-Tian-Shanskyi gold medal from the Russian geographical society.

References 

1865 births
1940 deaths
Foresters
Ukrainian ecologists